Odd Fellows Hall (1872–1932) in Boston, Massachusetts, was built for the Independent Order of Odd Fellows, Grand Lodge of Massachusetts. It occupied a large lot in the South End, at no.515 Tremont Street at Berkeley Street. Architect Joseph Billings designed the structure which had several large meeting rooms: Covenant Hall, Encampment Hall, Friendship Hall, Oasis Hall. Tenants included Emerson College of Oratory. Among the events that took place in the hall: 1892 annual dinner of the Tremont House Waiters’ Association. In January 1932 fire destroyed the building.

Images

References

External links

 Boston Public Library. Photos of January 1932 fire, by Leslie Jones:
 General alarm fire at Odd Fellows Hall, corner of Berkeley and Tremont
 General alarm fire at Odd Fellows Hall
 Six alarm fire at Odd Fellows Hall, Warren Ave, Tremont and Berkeley
 Six alarm fire, 4:20am at the Odd Fellows Building - Corner of Warren Ave., Tremont and Berkeley
 Ice-covered engine
 Crowd after the fire

Odd Fellows buildings in Massachusetts
Cultural infrastructure completed in 1872
Former buildings and structures in Boston
19th century in Boston
South End, Boston